Leucopogon clelandii, commonly known as Cleland's bearded-heath, is a species of flowering plant in the heath family Ericaceae and is endemic to the south-east of continental Australia. It is weak, open shrub with broadly egg-shaped leaves and white flowers arranged singly or in pairs in leaf axils near the ends of the branches.

Description

Taxonomy and naming
Leucopogon clelandii was first formally described in 1915 by Edwin Cheel in the Transactions and Proceedings of the Royal Society of South Australia from specimens collected by John Burton Cleland near Coonalpyn in 1911. The specific epithet (clelandii) honours Cleland.

Distribution and habitat
This leucopogon grows in mallee scrub and heath in the south-east of South Australia and to as far east as the Grampians in Victoria.

References

clelandii
Ericales of Australia
Flora of Victoria (Australia)
Flora of South Australia
Plants described in 1915
Taxa named by Edwin Cheel